The Cameron–Clegg coalition was formed by David Cameron and Nick Clegg when Cameron was invited by Queen Elizabeth II to form a government, following the resignation of Prime Minister Gordon Brown on 11 May 2010, after the general election on 6 May. It was the UK's first coalition government since the Churchill caretaker ministry in 1945. The coalition was led by Cameron as Prime Minister with Clegg as Deputy Prime Minister and composed of members of both Cameron's centre-right Conservative Party and Clegg's centrist Liberal Democrats.

The Cabinet was made up of sixteen Conservatives and five Liberal Democrats, with eight other Conservatives and one other Liberal Democrat attending cabinet but not members. The coalition was succeeded by the single-party, second Cameron ministry after the 2015 election.

History

The previous Parliament had been dissolved on 12 April 2010 in advance of the general election on 6 May. The election resulted in a hung parliament, no single party having an overall majority in the House of Commons, the Conservatives having the most seats but 20 short of a majority.

In the Conservative–Liberal Democrat coalition agreement of 11 May 2010, the two parties formed a coalition government. The new Parliament met on 18 May for the swearing-in of Peers in the House of Lords and newly elected and returning Members of Parliament in the House of Commons, and the election for the Speakership of the House of Commons. The Queen's Speech on 25 May set out the government's legislative agenda. Of the 57 Liberal Democrat MPs, only two refused to support the Conservative Coalition agreement, with former leader Charles Kennedy and Manchester Withington MP John Leech both rebelling.

The Liberal Democrats had five Cabinet members, including Nick Clegg as Deputy Prime Minister – though after the Cabinet and ministerial reshuffle, David Laws, who was a minister of state, was allowed to attend the Cabinet but was not a full member. If a Liberal Democrat minister resigned or was removed from office, another member of the same party would have had to be appointed to the Cabinet.

Each cabinet committee had a chair from one party and a deputy chair from the other; there was also a cabinet committee specifically overseeing the operation of the coalition. Both parties' ministers shared collective responsibility for the government's positions, although the coalition agreement detailed several issues on which the parties agreed to differ; the Liberal Democrats abstained from voting in such cases. Clegg, as Deputy Prime Minister, took Prime Minister's Questions (PMQs) when Cameron was unavailable.

Key decisions were made by a core group called the "Quad", made up of Cameron, Clegg, Chancellor of the Exchequer George Osborne and Chief Secretary to the Treasury Danny Alexander, which decided "all major matters of policy" and resolved disputes between the two parties.

While the government's front benchers sat together in the House of Commons and the two parties acted as a bloc during PMQ, the Liberal Democrat and Conservative backbenchers sat apart and each had their own whips, and the two parties competed in by-elections. On 4 September 2012, David Cameron reshuffled his cabinet for the first time. He reshuffled his cabinet for the second time on 14 July 2014.

Cabinets

May 2010 – September 2012

Changes
 David Laws resigned as Chief Secretary to the Treasury on 29 May 2010 because of an expenses irregularity dating from the previous Parliament. He was replaced by Danny Alexander, who was in turn replaced as Secretary of State for Scotland by Michael Moore.
 On 14 October 2011 Liam Fox resigned as Secretary of State for Defence following the procurement of high-level overseas meetings attendance for his friend and advisor, Adam Werrity, working for a private contractor, and stated that he had "mistakenly allowed the distinction between my personal interest and my government activities to become blurred". His successor was Philip Hammond, who was replaced as Transport Secretary by Justine Greening, the Economic Secretary to the Treasury, who was in turn replaced by Chloe Smith, an assistant government whip: she was replaced in turn by Greg Hands.
 On 3 February 2012 Chris Huhne resigned as Secretary of State for Energy and Climate Change following the decision of the Crown Prosecution Service to prosecute him and his former wife. His successor was Edward Davey, who was replaced as a Parliamentary Under-Secretary of State in the Department of Business, Innovation and Skills by Norman Lamb, replaced in his previous dual roles by Jenny Willott as an Assistant Whip and Jo Swinson as the Parliamentary Private Secretary to the Deputy Prime Minister.

September 2012 – July 2014

Changes
 On 19 October 2012, Andrew Mitchell resigned as Government Chief Whip in the House of Commons following controversy surrounding an argument with police officers in Downing Street. He was replaced by George Young.
 On 7 January 2013, Lord Strathclyde resigned as Leader of the House of Lords and Chancellor of the Duchy of Lancaster. He was replaced by Lord Hill of Oareford.
 On 7 October 2013, Michael Moore was replaced as Secretary of State for Scotland by Alistair Carmichael, during a reshuffle which focused on junior ministerial ranks.
 On 9 April 2014, Maria Miller resigned as Secretary of State for Culture, Media and Sport and Minister for Women and Equalities. She was replaced as Culture Secretary and Minister for Equalities by Sajid Javid, and by Nicky Morgan as Minister for Women. Morgan, who succeeded Javid as Financial Secretary to the Treasury, was not a full cabinet member but attended meetings in her role as Minister for Women.

July 2014 – May 2015

Changes
 On 5 August 2014, Baroness Warsi resigned as Minister of State at the Foreign and Commonwealth Office, and as Minister for Faith and Community, in protest at the Government's response to the conflict in the Gaza Strip. She was replaced at the Foreign Office by Baroness Anelay of St John's, with Communities and Local Government Secretary Eric Pickles taking on Warsi's former Faith and Community brief.

List of ministers

Prime Minister and Cabinet Office

Departments of State

Law officers

Parliament

See also

Fox–North coalition
Theresa May's tenure as Home Secretary
Premiership of David Cameron
Lib–Con pact
Lib–Lab pact
List of Acts of the Parliament of the United Kingdom, 2000–present
Shadow Cabinet of Ed Miliband

References

Bibliography

External links

British ministries
Government
Coalition governments of the United Kingdom
Ministry 1
Nick Clegg
2010 establishments in the United Kingdom
2010s in British politics
Ministries of Elizabeth II
Cabinets established in 2010
2015 disestablishments in the United Kingdom
Cabinets disestablished in 2015